Vienna is a city in Wood County, West Virginia, United States, situated along the Ohio River. The population was 10,676 at the 2020 census. It is the second-largest city in the Parkersburg–Vienna metropolitan area.

History
In 1794, Dr. Joseph Spencer gave the city its name. Dr, Joseph Spencer served as an aide de camp  to his father Joseph Spencer during the Revolutionary War. It began as a 5,000-acre settlement, a grant to Dr. Spencer for his services during the war. Charles R. Blair was Vienna's first mayor after it was incorporated in 1935. Vienna was known for Vitrolite production until the 1940s.

Geography
Vienna is located at  (39.325324, −81.542845).

Demographics

2010 census
At the 2010 census there were 10,749 people, 4,707 households, and 3,054 families living in the city. The racial makeup of the city was 95.9% White, 1.1% African American, 0.2% Native American, 1.4% Asian, 0.3% from other races, and 1.0% from two or more races. Hispanic or Latino of any race were 0.8%.

Of the 4,707 households 26.5% had children under the age of 18 living with them, 50.5% were married couples living together, 10.4% had a female householder with no husband present, 4.0% had a male householder with no wife present, and 35.1% were non-families. 30.4% of households were one person and 13.4% were one person aged 65 or older. The average household size was 2.24 and the average family size was 2.77.

The median age was 43.8 years. 20.2% of residents were under the age of 18; 8.1% were between the ages of 18 and 24; 23% were from 25 to 44; 29.1% were from 45 to 64; and 19.6% were 65 or older. The gender makeup of the city was 47.0% male and 53.0% female.

2000 census
At the 2000 census there were 10,861 people, 4,733 households, and 3,152 families living in the city. The population density was 2,895.8 people per square mile (1,118.3/km). There were 5,074 housing units at an average density of 1,352.8 per square mile (522.4/km).  The racial makeup of the city was 96.70% White, 0.95% African American, 0.17% Native American, 1.34% Asian, 0.02% Pacific Islander, 0.14% from other races, and 0.68% from two or more races. Hispanic or Latino of any race were 0.50%.

Of the 4,733 households 26.5% had children under the age of 18 living with them, 55.3% were married couples living together, 9.1% had a female householder with no husband present, and 33.4% were non-families. 30.3% of households were one person and 14.8% were one person aged 65 or older. The average household size was 2.29 and the average family size was 2.84.

The age distribution was 21.2% under the age of 18, 7.0% from 18 to 24, 25.3% from 25 to 44, 27.4% from 45 to 64, and 19.1% 65 or older. The median age was 43 years. For every 100 females, there were 87.9 males. For every 100 females age 18 and over, there were 83.5 males.

The median household income was $39,220 and the median family income was $49,477. Males had a median income of $41,779 versus $25,122 for females. The per capita income for the city was $24,452. About 5.3% of families and 7.7% of the population were below the poverty line, including 10.2% of those under age 18 and 7.6% of those age 65 or over.

Education
Vienna is home to Jackson Middle School. According to the school's web site, it was recognized as a West Virginia School of Excellence in 1998, a West Virginia Blue Ribbon School in 1999, a United States Department of Education Blue Ribbon School of Excellence in 1999–2000, and a West Virginia Exemplary School in 2000, 2004, and 2006. Jackson is regarded as one of the best middle schools in the state of West Virginia. Its feeder schools are Greenmont, Vienna, and Neale Elementary Schools.

Pollution
PFOA pollution in a stream in Vienna that originated in a DuPont chemical company landfill was the trigger for a landmark class-action lawsuit over PFOA contamination in the region.

See also
 Grand Central Mall

References

 
Cities in West Virginia
Cities in Wood County, West Virginia
Populated places established in 1935
1935 establishments in West Virginia
West Virginia populated places on the Ohio River